The Bureau of Global Talent Management (GTM), previously Bureau of Human Resources, is an agency in the United States Department of State. The bureau is under the purview of the Under Secretary of State for Management. The bureau handles recruitment, assignment evaluation, promotion, discipline, career development, and retirement policies and programs for the State Department's Foreign Service and Civil Service employees. The bureau also administers the Foreign Service Written Examination and Oral Assessment, publishes State Magazine, and coordinates the State Department's Student Internship Program, Virtual Student Federal Service (VSFS), and Pathways Internships.

See also
Foreign Service Officer
Rogers Act
United States Foreign Service

References

External links

HR
Civil service in the United States